This is a list of foreign players in Serie B of the Italian football league system. The following players:
have played at least one Serie B game for the respective club;
have not been capped for the Italy national team on any level, independently from the birthplace, except for players born in San Marino and active in the Italy national team before the first official match of the Sammarinese national team played on November 14, 1990 and players of Italian formation born abroad of Italian parents;
have been born in Italy and were capped by a foreign national team. This includes players who have dual citizenship with Italy.

These are all the teams that have had at least a foreign player while playing in a Serie B season and in bold are the ones currently playing for the 2022–23 season :

AlbinoLeffe, Alessandria, Alzano Virescit, Ancona, Arezzo, Ascoli, Atalanta, Avellino, Bari, Benevento, Bologna, Brescia, Cagliari, Carpi, Castel di Sangro, Catania, Catanzaro, Cesena, Chievo, Cittadella, Como, Cosenza, Crema, Cremonese, Crotone, Empoli, Entella, Fanfulla Lodi, Fermana, Fidelis Andria, Fiorentina, Foggia, Frosinone, Gallipoli, Genoa, Gubbio, Juve Stabia, Juventus, Lanciano, Latina, Lazio, Lecce, Lecco, Legnano, Licata, Livorno, Lucchese, Maceratese, Magenta Mantova, Messina, Milan, Modena, Monza, Napoli, Nocerina, Novara, Padova, Palermo, Parma, Perugia, Pescara, Piacenza, Pisa, Pordenone, Portogruaro, Pistoiese, Pro Patria, Pro Vercelli, Reggiana, Reggina, Rimini, Roma, Salernitana, Sambenedettese, Sampdoria, Sassuolo, Siena, SPAL, Spezia, Südtirol, Taranto, Ternana, Torino, Trapani, Treviso, Triestina, Udinese, Varese, Venezia, Verona, Vicenza, Voghera.

These are the only teams that have participated in Serie B but have not had a foreign player: Acireale, Alba Roma, Barletta, Biellese, Bolzano, Brindisi, Campobasso, Carrarese, Casale, Cavese, Centese, Derthona, Fiumana, Forlì, Matera, Massese

In bold are the players who are currently playing in Serie B.

Albania
Arlind Ajeti – Reggiana – 2020–21
Naser Aliji – Entella – 2017–18
Nedim Bajrami – Empoli – 2019–21
Migjen Basha – Rimini, Frosinone, Atalanta, Torino, Como, Bari – 2007–12, 2015–18
Etrit Berisha – SPAL – 2020–21
Sebahudin Biçaku – Voghera – 1945–47
Erjon Bogdani – Reggina, Salernitana, Verona – 2001–02, 2003–05
Edgar Cani – Ascoli, Padova, Modena, Carpi, Bari, Catania, Pisa – 2008–11, 2013–15, 2016–17
Kastriot Dermaku – Cosenza, Lecce – 2018–19, 2020–22
Berat Djimsiti – Avellino – 2016–17
Entonjo Elezaj – Perugia – 2016–17
Andrea Filipi – Alessandria – 2021–22
Elseid Hysaj – Empoli – 2012–14
Elvis Kabashi – Pescara, Como – 2013–14, 2021–23
Sergio Kalaj – Frosinone – 2021–
Elhan Kastrati – Pescara, Trapani, Cittadella – 2018–
Aristidi Kolaj – Alessandria – 2021–22
Marash Kumbulla – Verona – 2018–19
Naim Krieziu – Napoli – 1948–50
Dean Liço – Ascoli – 2020–21
Sllave Llambi – Fanfulla Lodi – 1942–43
Azdren Llullaku – Entella – 2017–18
Rey Manaj – Pisa – 2016–17
Agon Mehmeti – Novara – 2012–13
Hysen Memolla – Salernitana – 2018–19
Ledian Memushaj – Portogruaro, Carpi, Pescara – 2010–11, 2013–16, 2017–21
Florian Myrtaj – Verona, Catanzaro – 2003–06
Emanuele Ndoj – Brescia, Cosenza – 2016–19, 2020–
Harallamb Qaqi – Carpi – 2013–14
Fabio Sakaj – Modena – 2014–16
Romeo Shahinas – Latina – 2015–16
Thomas Strakosha – Salernitana – 2015–16
Armando Vajushi – Livorno, Pro Vercelli, Avellino – 2015–18
Frédéric Veseli – Empoli, Salernitana, Benevento – 2017–18, 2019–21, 2022–
Giacomo Vrioni – Venezia, Cittadella – 2018–20

Algeria
Najib Ammari – Latina, Entella, Spezia – 2014–18
Samir Beloufa – Monza – 1999–2000
Ismaël Bennacer – Empoli – 2017–18
Mohamed Salim Fares – Verona – 2016–17
Abdelkader Ghezzal – Crotone, Bari, Latina, Como – 2005–07, 2012–14, 2015–16
Mehdi Léris – Brescia – 2021–22
Djamel Mesbah – Avellino, Lecce – 2008–10
Mourad Meghni – Bologna – 2006–07

Andorra
Ildefons Lima – Triestina – 2005–09

Angola
Zito Luvumbo – Como, Cagliari – 2021–
Givestin N'Suki – Juve Stabia – 2011–12
M'Bala Nzola – Carpi, Trapani, Spezia – 2017–18, 2019–20

Antigua and Barbuda
DJ Buffonge – Spezia – 2019–20

Argentina

Australia
John Aloisi – Cremonese – 1996–97
Mark Birighitti – Varese – 2014–15
Mark Bresciano – Empoli – 1999–2002
Joshua Brillante – Como – 2015–16
Alessandro Circati – Parma – 2021–
Gabriel Cleur – Entella – 2016–17, 2020–21
Christian Esposito – Albinoleffe – 2008–09
Bruno Fornaroli – Sampdoria – 2011–12
Vincenzo Grella – Empoli, Ternana – 1999–2002
Zeljko Kalac – Perugia – 2004–05
Chris Ikonomidis – Salernitana – 2015–16
Fran Karačić – Brescia – 2020–
Adrian Madaschi – Portogruaro – 2010–11
Paul Okon – Vicenza – 2003–04
Nick Rizzo – Ancona, Ternana – 2000–02
Danny Tiatto – Salernitana – 1996–97
Carl Valeri – Grosseto, Sassuolo, Ternana – 2007–14
Jess Vanstrattan – Verona – 2004–06
Max Vieri – Ancona, Verona, Napoli, Ternana, Triestina, Arezzo – 2000–06

Austria
Muhammet Akagündüz – Verona – 2006–07
Peter Artner – Foggia – 1997–98
Dieter Elsneg – Frosinone – 2008–09
Marko Božić – Frosinone – 2021–22
György Garics – Napoli, Bologna – 2006–07, 2014–15
Robert Gucher – Frosinone, Vicenza, Pisa – 2008–11, 2014–15, 2016–17, 2019–22
Michael Hatz – Reggiana – 1997–98
 Stefan Ilsanker – Genoa – 2022–
Arnel Jakupović – Empoli – 2017–18
Engelbert König – Messina – 1950–52
Markus Pavic – Entella – 2020–21
Thomas Pichlmann – Grosseto, Verona, Spezia – 2007–13
Jürgen Prutsch – Livorno – 2010–13
Jürgen Säumel – Torino, Brescia – 2009–10
David Schnegg – Crotone – 2021–22
Roman Schramseis, Jr. – Udinese – 1947–49
Renny Smith – Vicenza – 2016–17
Lukas Spendlhofer – Varese, Ascoli – 2013–14, 2020–21
Srđan Spiridonović – Vicenza – 2014–15
Marko Stankovic – Triestina – 2008–10
Michael Svoboda – Venezia – 2020–21, 2022–
Maximilian Ullmann – Venezia – 2022–23
Daniel Wolf – Piacenza – 2007–11

Belarus
Sergei Aleinikov – Lecce – 1991–92 
Vitali Kutuzov – Avellino, Pisa, Parma, Bari – 2003–04, 2007–09 
Vital Rahozhkin – Siena – 2001–02 
Mikhail Sivakov – Piacenza – 2009–10

Belgium
Arnor Angeli – Avellino – 2014–15
Walter Baseggio – Treviso – 2006–07
Roberto Bisconti – Monza – 1997–98
Gilbert Bodart – Brescia, Ravenna – 1998–2001
Abdelhakim Bouhna – Latina – 2014–15
Maxime Busi – Parma – 2021–22
Luis Pedro Cavanda – Torino, Bari – 2010–12
Moutir Chajia – Novara, Ascoli, Entella, Como – 2016–20, 2021–
Elias Cobbaut – Parma – 2021–
Marc Emmers – Perugia – 1997–98
Xian Emmers – Cremonese – 2018–19
Corentin Fiore – Palermo – 2017–18
Daam Foulon – Benevento – 2021–
Jean-François Gillet – Monza, Bari, Treviso, Catania – 1999–2000, 2001–09, 2014–15
Michaël Goossens – Genoa – 1996–97
Marco Ingrao – Vicenza – 2005–06
Benoît Ladrière – Avellino – 2013–14
Jordan Lukaku – Vicenza – 2021–22
Donovan Maury – Juve Stabia – 2011–13
Gaby Mudingayi – Torino, Pisa – 2004–05, 2016–17
Radja Nainggolan – Piacenza, SPAL – 2005–10, 2022–
Nicolas Napol – Avellino – 2015–16
Pierre-Yves Ngawa – Avellino, Perugia, Foggia – 2017–19
Maecky Ngombo – Ascoli – 2018–19
Mardochee Nzita – Perugia, Pescara – 2019–21
Luis Oliveira – Como, Catania, Venezia – 2001–05
Stephane Omeonga – Avellino, Pescara – 2016–17, 2020–21
Olivier Renard – Modena – 2004–05
Cédric Roussel – Brescia – 2006–07
Tony Sergeant – Bari – 2007–08
Mohamed Soumarè – Avellino – 2014–17
Jari Vandeputte – Vicenza – 2020–21
Bruno Versavel – Perugia – 1997–98
Johan Walem – Torino, Catania – 2003–05
Reno Wilmots – Avellino, Carpi – 2017–19

Bosnia-Herzegovina
Mustafa Arslanović – Ascoli – 1990–91
Riad Bajić – Ascoli, Brescia – 2020–22
Adrian Leon Barišić – Frosinone – 2021–22
Gordan Bunoza – Pescara – 2014–16
Milan Đurić – Cesena, Ascoli, Crotone, Trapani, Cittadella, Salernitana – 2007–08, 2009–12, 2013–14, 2015–17, 2018–21
Mato Jajalo – Palermo, Venezia – 2017–19, 2022–
Davor Jozić – Cesena – 1991–93
Rade Krunić – Empoli – 2017–18
Zoran Kvržić – Spezia – 2015–16
Andrej Modić – Vicenza, Brescia – 2015–17
Vedin Music – Como, Modena, Torino, Treviso – 2001–02, 2004–08
Zlatan Muslimović – Pistoiese, Ascoli – 2001–03
Enis Nadarević – Varese, Cesena, Bari, Trapani, Novara – 2010–16
Sanjin Prcić – Perugia – 2015–16
Dario Šarić – Carpi, Ascoli, Palermo – 2017–19, 2020–
Blaz Sliskovic – Pescara – 1993–94
Marko Topić – Monza – 1998–2000

Brazil

Bulgaria
Valentin Antov – Monza – 2021–22
Valeri Bojinov – Lecce, Juventus, Verona, Vicenza, Ternana, Pescara – 2002–03, 2006–07, 2012–13, 2014–15, 2019–20
Ivaylo Chochev – Palermo – 2017–19
Krassimir Chomakov – Ravenna – 2000–01
Andrey Galabinov – Livorno, Avellino, Novara, Spezia, Reggina – 2010–11, 2013–17, 2018–20, 2021–
Andrea Hristov – Cosenza – 2018–19, 2021–22
Petko Hristov – Venezia – 2022–
Atanas Iliev – Ascoli – 2021–22
Radoslav Kirilov – Carpi – 2013–14
Vladislav Mirchev – Ancona – 2009–10
Pavel Vidanov – Trapani – 2014–15
Petar Zhabov – Cosenza – 1998–2001

Burkina Faso
Yves Benoit Bationo – Empoli – 2012–13
Salif Dianda – Verona, Ternana – 2006–07, 2012–16

Cameroon
Steve Leo Beleck – Crotone – 2014–15
Jean-Claude Billong – Benevento, Foggia, Salernitana – 2018–20
Joseph Bouasse – Vicenza – 2016–17
Mack Bono – Ternana – 2004–06
Daniel Chigou – Ternana – 2001–02
Joss Didiba – Perugia – 2015–17
Steeve Gerard Fankà – Ascoli 2008−09
Patrice Feussi – Genoa, Pisa – 2002–03, 2007–09
Divine Fonjock – Treviso – 2008–09
Antonio Ghomsi – Genoa, Salernitana, Avellino – 2002–05, 2008–09
Samuel Ipoua – Torino – 1996–97
Thomas Herve Job – Sampdoria, Pescara, Cremonese, Ascoli, Pisa, Grosseto, Cittadella – 2001–02, 2004–06, 2007–12
Daniel Maa Boumsong – Treviso – 2006–07
Kelvin Matute – Cesena, Triestina, Crotone, Pro Vercelli – 2009–11, 2012–15
Albert Meyong – Ravenna – 1998–99
Joseph Minala – Bari, Latina, Salernitana – 2014–19
Frank Ongfiang – Palermo – 2002–03
Louisse Parfait – Piacenza, Crotone, Ascoli, Cesena – 2009–13
Laurent Sanda – Genoa – 2001–02
Thomas Som – Grosseto – 2012–13
Hilarie Tankoua – Crotone – 2000–01
Pierre Wome – Lucchese – 1997–98
Francis Zé – Sampdoria – 2002–03

Canada
Enzo Concina – Cesena, Piacenza, Monza – 1984–85, 1987–90
Axel Desjardins – Spezia – 2019–20
Ricardo Ferreira – Empoli – 2012–13
Andrea Lombardo – Atalanta – 2005–06
Rocco Placentino – Avellino – 2003–04
Julian Uccello – Crotone – 2010–12

Cape Verde
Alessio Da Cruz – Novara, Parma, Spezia, Ascoli, Vicenza – 2017–20, 2021–22

Chile
Carlos Carmona – Reggina, Atalanta – 2009–11
Nicolas Cordova – Crotone, Bari, Ascoli, Messina, Grosseto, Brescia – 2001–05, 2007–10, 2011–12
Nicolás Corvetto – Triestina – 2009–10
Pablo Galdames – Genoa – 2022–23
Julio Gutiérrez – Messina, Pescara – 2001–04
Luis Antonio Jiménez – Ternana – 2002–06
Marcelo Larrondo – Siena – 2010–11
Mauricio Pinilla – Grosseto – 2009–10
Sebastián Pinto – Varese – 2010–11
Luis Rojas – Crotone – 2021–22
Mario Salgado – Verona, Ternana, Brescia, Albinoleffe, Avellino, Torino – 2002–03, 2004–06, 2007–08, 2009–10
Felipe Seymour – Spezia – 2013–14
Francisco Sierralta – Parma, Empoli – 2017–18, 2019–20
Jorge Toro – Modena – 1964–69, 1970–71
Jaime Valdes – Bari, Lecce – 2001–04, 2006–07
Jorge Vargas – Reggina, Empoli – 2001–02, 2008–09
Alex Von Schwedler – Bari – 2002–05

Colombia
Jorge Bolaño – Modena – 2007–09
Damir Ceter – Chievo, Pescara, Bari – 2019–21, 2022–
Ricardo Chará – Empoli – 2010–12
Miguel Guerrero – Bari – 1996–97
Gonzalo Martínez – Napoli – 2003–04
Jonny Mosquera – Livorno – 2014–15
Yeferson Paz – Perugia – 2022–
Brayan Perea – Perugia – 2014–15
Andrés Tello – Cagliari, Bari, Benevento – 2015–16, 2017–20, 2021–
Brayan Vera – Cosenza, Lecce – 2020–22
Jherson Vergara – Avellino, Livorno – 2014–16
Alexis Zapata – Perugia – 2015–17

Congo
Antoine Makoumbou – Cagliari – 2022–
Dominique Malonga – Cesena, Vicenza, Pro Vercelli – 2009–10, 2012–13, 2015–17
Yves Pambou – Reggina – 2013–14

DR Congo
Samuel Bastien – Avellino – 2015–16
Pedro Kamata – Bari, Siena – 2007–09, 2010–11
Christian Kanyengele – Savoia, Catania – 1999–2000, 2003–05
Jason Mayélé – Cagliari – 2000–02
Benjamin Mokulu – Avellino, Frosinone, Cremonese, Carpi – 2014–19
Olivier N'Siabamfumu – Crotone – 2009–10
Granddi Ngoyi – Palermo – 2013–14

Costa Rica
Gilberto Martínez – Brescia – 2005–06, 2008–10, 2011–12
Winston Parks – Ascoli – 2002–03
Anco Marcio Vargas – Pisa – 1950–52

Croatia
Milan Badelj – Genoa – 2022–
Ricardo Bagadur – Salernitana, Benevento – 2015–17
Andrija Balić – Perugia – 2019–20
Zoran Ban – Pescara – 1996–97
Saša Bjelanović – Genoa, Vicenza, Atalanta, Verona, Varese – 2003–04, 2008–14
Luka Bogdan – Vicenza, Livorno, Salernitana, Ternana – 2016–17, 2018–
Josip Brezovec – Spezia – 2014–16
Petar Brlek – Ascoli – 2019–20
Dražen Brnčić – Cremonese, Monza, Ancona, Venezia – 1998–2000, 2001–03
Igor Bubnjić – Brescia – 2016–17
Igor Budan – Empoli, Venezia, Ancona, Atalanta – 2000–01, 2002–04, 2005–06
Ante Budimir – Crotone – 2015–16, 2018–19
Karlo Butić – Pordenone, Cosenza – 2020–23
Dario Čanađija – Spezia – 2014–16
Vedran Celjak – Grosseto, Padova – 2012–14
Tibor Čiča – Cesena – 2012–13
Antonini Čulina – Spezia – 2013–15
Borislav Cvetković – Ascoli – 1990–91
Mario Cvitanović – Genoa, Napoli – 2002–04
Niko Datković – Spezia – 2013–15, 2016–17
Ivan Delić – Cosenza – 2022–
Damjan Đoković – Cesena, Livorno, Spezia – 2012–13, 2014–15, 2016–17
Marko Dugandžić – Ternana – 2014–17
Tomislav Erceg – Ancona – 1997–98
Martin Erlić – Spezia – 2019–20
Tomislav Gomelt – Bari, Crotone – 2014–15, 2018–20
Kristijan Ipša – Reggina – 2013–14
Robert Jarni – Bari – 1992–93
Ivan Javorčić – Brescia, Crotone – 1998–2001
Marko Jordan – Latina – 2016–17 
Krunoslav Jurcic – Torino, Sampdoria – 2000–02
Roko Jureškin – Pisa, Benevento – 2022–
Ivan Jurić – Crotone, Genoa – 2001–02, 2004–07
Stanko Jurić – Parma – 2021–
Ivan Kelava – Carpi – 2014–15
Renato Kelić – Padova – 2013–14
Ivan Kontek – Ternana – 2021–22
Dario Knežević – Livorno – 2010–12
Niko Kovač – Juventus – 2006–07
Miljenko Kovačić – Brescia – 1996–97
Anton Krešić – Trapani, Avellino, Cremonese, Carpi – 2016–19
Tonći Kukoč – Brescia, Livorno, Como – 2013–14, 2015–16
Antonio Lukanović – Novara – 2016–17
Karlo Lulić – Frosinone – 2021–
Mirko Marić – Monza, Crotone – 2020–22
Antonio Marin – Monza – 2020–21
Ivan Martić – Spezia – 2015–16
Kristjan Matošević – Cosenza – 2021–23
Hrvoje Milić – Crotone – 2018–19
Mato Miloš – Siena, Spezia, Perugia – 2013–16
Josip Mišić – Spezia – 2015–16
Mislav Oršić – Spezia – 2013–14
Igor Ostopanj – Pistoiese – 2001–02
Marko Pajač – Benevento, Perugia, Brescia, Genoa – 2016–18, 2020–
Manuel Pamić – Frosinone – 2014–15
Bruno Petković – Varese, Entella, Trapani – 2014–17 
Tomi Petrović – Entella – 2017–18, 2020–21
Josip Posavec – Palermo – 2017–18
Franjo Prce – Salernitana, Brescia – 2015–17
Ivan Rajčić – Bari, Frosinone – 2005–09
Milan Rapaić – Perugia – 1997–98
Marko Rog – Cagliari – 2022–
Tomislav Rukavina – Venezia – 2000–01, 2002–03
Tomislav Šarić – Crotone – 2013–14
Adrian Šemper – Chievo, Genoa – 2019–21, 2022–
Lorenco Šimić – Empoli, Lecce, Ascoli – 2017–18, 2021–
Mario Šitum – Spezia, Reggina, Cosenza – 2014–16, 2020–22
Dario Smoje – Monza, Ternana – 1998–2001
Stjepan Tomas – Vicenza – 2001–02
Goran Tomić – Reggina, Vicenza – 1998–2000
Dalibor Višković – Vicenza – 2006–07
Davor Vugrinec – Lecce, Atalanta, Catania – 2002–03, 2004–05
Dragan Vukoja – Foggia, Genoa, Pescara – 1997–2001
Ante Vukušić – Pescara – 2013–14, 2015–16
Stipe Vulikić – Perugia – 2022–
Tonči Žilić – Castel di Sangro, Verona, Siena – 1997–99, 2000–01
Dario Župarić – Pescara – 2013–16

Cyprus
Nicholas Ioannou – Como – 2021–
Andreas Karo – Salernitana – 2019–21
Grigoris Kastanos – Pescara, Frosinone – 2019–21

Czech Republic
Jan Hable – Ascoli – 2009–10
Jan Havlena – Entella – 2016–17
David Heidenreich – SPAL – 2021–22
Ondřej Herzán – Lecce, Spezia – 2006–08
Jakub Jankto – Ascoli – 2015–16
Marek Jankulovski – Napoli – 2001–02
Martin Jiranek – Reggina – 2001–02
Václav Koloušek – Salernitana, Fermana – 1997–98, 1999–2000, 2002–03
Libor Kozák – Brescia, Bari, Livorno – 2009–10, 2017–19
Edvard Lasota – Reggiana – 1998–99
Martin Lejsal – Venezia – 2004–05
Roman Macek – Bari, Cremonese – 2016–18
Aleš Matějů – Brescia, Palermo – 2018–19, 2020–
Pavel Nedvěd – Juventus – 2006–07
Milan Nitrianský – Avellino – 2015–16
Michael Rabušic – Perugia, Crotone – 2014–15
Jaroslav Sedivec – Catania, Perugia, Crotone, Triestina, Mantova – 2002–10
Stefan Šimić – Varese – 2014–15 
Tomáš Skuhravý – Genoa – 1995–96
Pavel Srnicek – Cosenza – 2002–03
Cestmir Vycpalek – Palermo, Parma – 1947–48, 1954–58
Lukáš Zima – Livorno – 2018–20
Jaromír Zmrhal – Brescia – 2020–21

Denmark
Magnus Kofod Andersen – Venezia – 2022–
Lennart Bak – Foggia – 1996–98
Niels Bennike – Spal – 1950–51
Klaus Berggreen – Pisa – 1984–85
Martin Bergvold – Livorno – 2008–09
Kurt Christensen – Catania – 1966–67
Hans Colberg – Lucchese – 1952–53
Riza Durmisi – Salernitana – 2020–21
Thomas Fig – Padova – 1996–98
Kai Frandsen – Lucchese – 1952–53
Morten Frendrup – Genoa – 2022–
Simon Graves – Palermo – 2022–
Christian Gytkjær – Monza – 2020–22
Karl Aage Hansen – Catania – 1955–57
Thomas Helveg – Udinese – 1994–95
Morten Hjulmand – Lecce – 2020–22
Daniel Jensen – Novara – 2012–13
Emil Kornvig – Cosenza – 2022–
Henrik Larsen – Pisa – 1992–93
Martin Laursen – Verona – 1998–99
Christian Lonstrup – Cagliari – 1997–98
Søren Mussmann – Pro Vercelli – 2016–17
Matti Lund Nielsen – Pescara, Verona, Perugia – 2012–15
Marc Nygaard – Catania, Vicenza – 2003–04
Jens Odgaard – Pescara – 2020–21
Leif Petersen – Livorno – 1950–52
John Sivebæk – Pescara – 1993–94
Erling Sørensen – Modena – 1949–50
Frederik Sørensen – Pescara, Ternana – 2020–
Thomas Thorninger – Perugia – 1997–98
Magnus Troest – Parma, Atalanta, Varese, Virtus Lanciano, Novara, Juve Stabia – 2008–09, 2010–18, 2019–20

Dominican Republic
Edwards Vinicio Espinal – Crotone, Portogruaro, Pro Vercelli – 2006–07, 2010–11, 2012–13
Elpys José Espinal – Atalanta, Cesena – 1999–2000, 2009–10
Gianluigi Sueva – Cosenza – 2020–22

Ecuador
Bryan Cabezas – Avellino – 2017–18
Erick Ferigra – Ascoli – 2019–20
Damián Lanza – Arezzo – 2006–07

Egypt
Ahmed Hegazy – Perugia – 2014–15
Hany Said – Bari, Messina, Fiorentina – 2001–04

England
Charles Adcock – Padova, Triestina – 1948–49, 1950–51
Luis Binks – Como – 2022–
Gordon Cowans – Bari – 1986–88
Tony Dorigo – Torino – 1997–98
Frank Rawcliffe – Alessandria – 1949–50
Paul Rideout – Bari – 1986–88
Kris Thackray – Ancona – 2009–10

Equatorial Guinea
Pedro Obiang – Sampdoria – 2011–12
Pepín – Trapani, Brescia, Pescara, Monza – 2016–22

Estonia
Enar Jääger – Ascoli – 2009–10
Tarmo Kink – Varese – 2012–13
Georgi Tunjov – SPAL – 2021–

Finland
Mehmet Hetemaj – Albinoleffe, Reggina – 2009–13
Perparim Hetemaj – Brescia, Benevento, Reggina – 2009–10, 2019–20, 2021–22
Jesse Joronen – Brescia, Venezia – 2020–
Niki Mäenpää – Venezia – 2020–21, 2022–
Sakari Mattila – Ascoli – 2009–10
Tomi Petrescu – Ascoli – 2008–09
Joel Pohjanpalo – Venezia – 2022–
Jonas Portin – Ascoli, Padova – 2009–12
Simon Skrabb – Brescia – 2020–21
Sauli Väisänen – Crotone, Chievo, Cosenza – 2018–

France
Thierry Audel – Triestina – 2007–08, 2009–10
Florian Ayé – Brescia – 2020–
Abou Ba – Cosenza, Alessandria – 2020–22
Alain Baclet – Lecce, Vicenza, Frosinone, Cosenza – 2009–13, 2018–19
Mohamed Bahlouli – Cosenza – 2019–21
Bryan Bergougnoux – Lecce – 2009–10
Jonathan Biabiany – Modena, Trapani – 2007–09, 2019–20
Philippe Billy – Lecce – 2002–03
Alexis Blin – Lecce – 2021–22
Rodrigue Boisfer – Genoa, Venezia, Gubbio – 1998–2005, 2011–12
Charles Boli – Vicenza – 2021–22
Antoine Bonifaci – Torino – 1959–60
Landry Bonnefoi – Messina – 2003–04
Ange-Yoan Bonny – Parma – 2021–
Jean-Alain Boumsong – Juventus – 2006–07
Sid-Ahmed Bouziane – Sampdoria – 2002–03
Julien Brellier – Venezia, Salernitana – 2003–05
Alexis Carra – Vicenza, Cittadella – 2009–12
Yunes Chaib – Genoa – 2003–04
Gabriel Charpentier – Reggina, Ascoli, Frosinone, Parma – 2020–
Alexandre Coeff – Brescia – 2022–
Stephane Coquin – Genoa – 2000–02
Jean-Christophe Coubronne – Novara – 2010–11
Woyo Coulibaly – Parma – 2021–
Michaël Cuisance – Venezia – 2022–23
Jean-Pierre Cyprien – Lecce, Crotone – 1998–99, 2000–01
Lucas Da Cunha – Como – 2022–
Sebastian De Maio – Brescia, Frosinone, Vicenza, Modena – 2006–07, 2008–13, 2021–
Salim Diakite – Ternana – 2021–
Modibo Diakité – Pescara, Ternana, Bari – 2005–06, 2016–18
Enzo Di Santantonio – Brescia – 2017–18
Mehdi Dorval – Bari – 2022–
Abdou Doumbia – Ascoli – 2010–11
Mathieu Duhamel – Foggia – 2017–18
Steeve-Mike Eboa Ebongue – Cosenza – 2021–22
Jean Lambert Evans – Crotone – 2019–20
Patrice Evra – Monza – 1999–2000
Mohamed Fofana – Ravenna, Virtus Lanciano – 2007–08, 2012–14
Nicolas Frey – Modena, Venezia, Chievo – 2005–08,  2017–18, 2019–20
Christophe Galtier – Monza – 1997–98
Valentin Gendrey – Lecce – 2021–22
Gaël Genevier – Catania, Pisa, Torino, Siena, Livorno, Juve Stabia, Novara – 2003–04, 2007–14
Guillaume Gigliotti – Novara, Empoli, Ascoli, Salernitana, Crotone, Chievo – 2010–11, 2012–13, 2017–21
Maxime Giron – Avellino – 2015–16
Eddy Gnahoré – Perugia, Palermo – 2016–18
Claudio Gomes – Palermo – 2022–
Prince-Désir Gouano – Virtus Lanciano – 2012–13
Antoine Hainaut – Parma – 2022–
Thomas Heurtaux – Salernitana – 2019–20
Matthieu Huard – Brescia – 2021–
Sem Ogolong Kamana – Juve Stabia – 2012–13
Ibrahim Karamoko – Chievo – 2019–20
Abdoulay Konko – Crotone – 2004–06
Sabri Lamouchi – Genoa – 2004–05
Loïck Landre – Pisa – 2016–17
Laurent Lanteri – Novara – 2010–11
Nicolas Laspalles – Lecce – 2002–03
Mickaël Latour – Virtus Entella – 2014–15
Gaëtan Laura – Cosenza – 2021–22
Vincent Laurini – Empoli – 2012–14
Matthias Lepiller – Verona, Novara – 2011–14
Maxime Leverbe – Chievo, Pisa, Benevento – 2019–
Robert Maah – Bari, Grosseto, Cittadella – 2005–06, 2008–09, 2011–13
Zinédine Machach – Carpi, Crotone, Cosenza – 2018–20
Andrew Marie-Sainte – Livorno – 2018–20
Jean–Christophe Marquet – Genoa – 1998–99
Nassim Mendil – Cosenza, Catania, Ascoli, Salernitana – 2001–03, 2004–05
Jérémy Ménez – Reggina – 2020–
Arnauld Mercier – Fidelis Andria, Savoia, Cosenza – 1998–2001
Hemza Mihoubi – Lecce – 2006–08
François Modesto – Cagliari – 2000–04
Mathieu Moreau – Ternana, Varese – 2004–05, 2010–12
David Mounard – Gallipoli, Siena – 2009–11
Hervin Ongenda – Chievo – 2019–20
Julian Palmieri – Crotone – 2006–07
Marc Pfertzel – Livorno – 2003–04
Sébastien Piocelle – Crotone, Grosseto – 2005–08
Kyllan Ramé – Foggia – 2017–19
Julien Rantier – Vicenza, Albinoleffe, Verona, Piacenza – 2003–09
Ihsan Sacko – Cosenza – 2020–21
Richard-Quentin Samnick – Bari – 2013–14
Christophe Sanchez – Venezia – 2002–03
Aurélien Scheidler – Bari – 2022–
Samuel Souprayen – Verona – 2016–17
Ousmane Sy – Reggina – 2010–11
Sanasi Sy – Salernitana, Cosenza – 2020–22
Anthony Taugourdeau – Pisa, Albinoleffe, Trapani, Venezia, Vicenza – 2008–09, 2010–12, 2019–22
Abdoulaye Touré – Genoa – 2022–
Lisandru Tramoni – Pisa – 2022–
Matteo Tramoni – Brescia, Pisa – 2021–
Aliou Traoré – Parma – 2021–22
David Trezeguet – Juventus – 2006–07
Valentin Vanbaleghem – Perugia – 2021–22
Kevin Vinetot – Crotone, Südtirol – 2010–13, 2022–
Arthur Yamga – Carpi, Pescara – 2017–18
Abdallah Yaisien – Trapani – 2013–14
Cyril Yapi – Como – 2003–04
Jonathan Zebina – Juventus – 2006–07

Gabon
Catilina Aubameyang – Triestina – 2003–04
Willy Aubameyang – Avellino – 2008–09
Anthony Oyono – Frosinone – 2021–

Gambia
Lamin Jallow – Trapani, Cesena, Salernitana, Vicenza – 2016–21
Sulayman Jallow – Ascoli – 2017–18
Lamin Jawo – Carpi – 2016–17
Musa Juwara – Crotone – 2021–22
Kalifa Manneh – Perugia – 2021–22
Ali Sowe – Juve Stabia, Pescara, Latina, Modena – 2013–16
Bamba Susso – Pisa – 2020–21

Georgia
Davit Dighmelashvili – Siena – 2001–02
Levan Mchedlidze – Empoli – 2010–14
Irakli Shekiladze – Empoli, Latina, Spezia – 2011–15, 2017–18
Georgi Nemsadze – Reggiana – 1998–99

Germany
Oliver Bierhoff – Ascoli – 1992–95
Manfred Binz – Brescia – 1996–97
Albert Brülls – Modena – 1964–65
Lennart Czyborra – Genoa – 2022–
Thomas Doll – Bari – 1996–97
Stefan Effenberg – Fiorentina – 1993–94
Salvatore Gambino – Trapani – 2013–14
Giuseppe Gemiti – Genoa, Modena, Piacenza, Novara, Livorno, Bari – 2004–09, 2010–11, 2012–13, 2014–16
André Gumprecht – Lecce – 1994–95
Rudolf Kölbl – Padova, Genoa – 1962–64, 1965–66
Oliver Kragl – Frosinone, Foggia, Benevento, Ascoli – 2016–21
Markus Münch – Genoa – 1998–99
Shkodran Mustafi – Sampdoria – 2011–12
Savio Nsereko – Brescia, Juve Stabia – 2007–09, 2011–12
Tobias Pachonik – Carpi – 2017–19
Karl–Heinz Spikofski – Catania – 1956–57
Idrissa Touré – Pisa – 2021–

Ghana
Boadu Acosty – Juve Stabia, Carpi, Modena, Latina – 2012–13, 2014–17
Bright Addae – Crotone, Ascoli, Juve Stabia – 2012–13, 2015–20
Dominic Adiyiah – Reggina – 2010–11
Daniel Agyei – Juve Stabia – 2012–13
Masahudu Alhassan – Novara, Latina, Perugia – 2012–17
Moro Alhassan – Cesena, Vicenza – 2013–15
Yaw Asante – Grosseto – 2009–13
Nii Nortey Ashong – Spezia – 2013–14
Patrick Asmah – Avellino – 2016–17
Kwame Ayew – Lecce – 1994–95
Ahmed Barusso – Rimini, Brescia, Torino, Livorno, Nocerina, Novara – 2006–07, 2009–13
Abdallah Basit – Benevento – 2019–20
Emmanuel Besea – Modena, Frosinone, Venezia – 2015–16, 2017–19
Richmond Boakye – Sassuolo, Latina – 2011–13, 2015–17
Kevin-Prince Boateng – Monza – 2020–21
Raman Chibsah – Sassuolo, Benevento, Frosinone – 2012–13, 2016–18
Isaac Cofie – Torino, Piacenza, Sassuolo – 2010–12
 Caleb Ekuban – Genoa – 2022–
Abeam Emmanuel Danso – Triestina – 2010–11
Amadou Diambo – Pescara – 2019–21
Isaac Donkor – Bari, Avellino, Cesena – 2015–18
Godfred Donsah – Crotone – 2021–22
Alfred Duncan – Livorno – 2012–13
Mark Edusei – Lecce, Cosenza, Piacenza, Torino, Bari – 1996–97, 1998–99, 2001–04, 2005–06, 2008–09
Bismark Ekye – Fiorentina – 2003–04
Mohammed Gargo – Venezia, Genoa – 2002–03, 2004–05
Bright Gyamfi – Benevento, Reggiana – 2016–17, 2018–22
Asamoah Gyan – Modena – 2004–06
Emmanuel Gyasi – Spezia – 2018–20
Edmund Hottor – Triestina, Virtus Lanciano – 2009–10, 2012–13
Nii Lamptey – Venezia – 1996–97
Shaka Mawuli – Südtirol – 2022–
Davis Mensah – Pordenone – 2021–22
John Mensah – Genoa, Cremonese – 2001–02, 2005–06
Isaac Ntow – Brescia, Como – 2013–16
Desmond N'Ze – Verona, Avellino – 2006–07, 2008–09
Moses Odjer – Catania, Salernitana, Trapani – 2014–20
Evans Osei – Pro Vercelli – 2016–17
Benjamin Owusu – Brescia – 2008–09
Ibrahim Abdul Razak – Empoli – 2001–02
Abubakari Sadicki – Vicenza – 2003–04
Amidu Salifu – Vicenza, Modena, Perugia, Brescia – 2010–11, 2013–16
Ransford Selasi – Pescara, Novara – 2013–17
Nana Welbeck – Brescia – 2011–14

Greece
Giorgos Antzoulas – Cosenza – 2020–21
Tasos Avlonitis – Ascoli – 2020–22
Christos Donis – Ascoli – 2020–21
Giannis Fetfatzidis – SPAL – 2022–
Savvas Gentsoglou – Livorno, Spezia, Bari – 2012–14, 2015–16
Panagiotis Giannopoulos – Venezia – 2004–05
Giorgos Katidis – Novara – 2013–14
Christos Kourfalidis – Cagliari – 2022–
Ilias Koutsoupias – Entella, Ternana, Benevento – 2020–
Giorgos Kyriazis – Catania, Arezzo, Salernitana, Triestina – 2002–03, 2004–10
Konstantinos Loumpoutis – Perugia – 2004–05
Georgios Makris – Pisa – 2016–17
Vaggelis Moras – Bologna, Verona, Bari – 2007–08, 2012–13, 2016–17
Evangelos Nastos – Perugia, Vicenza, Ascoli – 2004–09
Antonis Natsouras – Cremonese – 2005–06
Dimitris Nikolaou – Empoli – 2019–21
Marios Oikonomou – Bologna, Bari – 2014–15, 2017–18
Antonis Petropoulos – Bari – 2015–16
Ioannis Potouridis – Novara – 2013–14
Dimitrios Sounas – Perugia – 2021–22
Antonis Siatounis – Monza – 2021–22
Dimitris Stavropoulos – Reggina – 2020–22
Panagiotis Tachtsidis – Grosseto, Verona, Lecce – 2010–12, 2018–19, 2020–21
Lambros Vangelis – Siena – 2001–02
Georgios Vakouftsis – Ravenna – 2000–01
Apostolos Vellios – Ascoli – 2020–21
Dimitrios Vosnakidis – Bari – 2013–14
Zisis Vryzas – Fiorentina, Torino – 2003–04, 2005–06
Vasilis Zagaritis – Parma – 2021–

Guadeloupe
Andreaw Gravillon – Pescara, Ascoli – 2017–20
Raphael Mirval – Perugia – 2015–17

Guinea
Ismaël Karba Bangoura – Cesena – 2012–14
Gaston Camara – Bari, Modena, Brescia – 2015–17
Karamoko Cissé – Albinoleffe, Benevento, Bari, Verona, Carpi, Juve Stabia, Cittadella – 2008–12, 2016–21
Moustapha Cissé – Pisa, Südtirol – 2022–
Amara Konaté – Perugia – 2019–20
Mathias Pogba – Pescara – 2014–15

Guinea Bissau
Abel Camará – Cremonese – 2017–18
Idrissa Camará – Avellino – 2016–18
Carlos Embaló – Carpi, Brescia, Palermo, Cosenza, Cittadella – 2014–16, 2017–19, 2022–
Janio Bikel – Vicenza – 2021–22

Honduras
Edgar Alvarez – Pisa – 2008–09
Julio César de León – Reggina, Fiorentina, Catanzaro, Avellino, Genoa, Parma, Torino – 2001–02, 2003–04, 2005–06, 2006–07, 2008–10
Carlos Pavón – Napoli – 2001–03
Rigoberto Rivas – Brescia, Reggina – 2017–18, 2020–
David Suazo – Cagliari – 2000–04

Hungary
Krisztián Adorján – Novara, Entella – 2015–17, 2019–20
Botond Balogh – Parma – 2021–
Norbert Balogh – Palermo – 2017–18
Zsolt Bognár – Frosinone – 2007–08
Géza Boldizsár – Crema – 1946–48
Csaba Csizmadia — Grosseto – 2008–09
Lajos Détári – Bologna – 1991–92
János Hrotkó – Pro Sesto – 1946–49
Róbert Feczesin – Brescia, Ascoli, Padova – 2007–09, 2010–14
Árpád Fekete – Como, Pro Sesto, Messina, Cagliari – 1964–49, 1951–53
Attila Filkor – Grosseto, Sassuolo, Gallipoli, Triestina, Livorno, Bari, Avellino – 2007–13, 2014–15
János Füzér – Pisa – 1948–49
Krisztián Kenesei – Avellino – 2007–08
Mihály Kincses – Salernitana – 1952–54
Vladimir Koman – Avellino, Sampdoria – 2008–09, 2011–12
Lajos Kovács – Fanfulla Lodi – 1947–48
Ádám Kovácsik – Reggina, Carpi – 2009–10, 2011–12, 2013–14
Zsolt Laczkó – Sampdoria, Vicenza, Padova – 2011–14
György Mogoy – Catania – 1949–50
Ádám Nagy – Pisa – 2021–
János Nehadoma – Livorno, Modena – 1932–33, 1936–37
István Nyers – Lecco – 1958–60
Gyula Polgar – Magenta – 1947–48
Péter Rajczi – Pisa – 2007–08
Tamás Sándor – Torino – 1997–98
Ádám Simon – Bari – 2011–12
Lóránd Szatmári – Avellino – 2008–09
Sándor Szobel – Palermo – 1947–48
László Szőke – Triestina, Brescia – 1957–58, 1959–61, 1962–63
Krisztián Tamás – Varese, Spezia – 2014–17
 – Modena – 1950–51
Mihail Uram – Spezia – 1949–51
Jeno Vadkerti – Magenta – 1947–48
Roland Varga – Brescia – 2009–10
Ádám Vass – Brescia – 2007–10, 2011–12
Tamás Vaskó – Avellino – 2008–09 
József Viola – Atalanta – 1930–31
Mihály Vörös – Bari – 1950–51
János Zorgo – Prato – 1947–48, 1949–50

Iceland
Bjarki Steinn Bjarkason – Venezia – 2020–21
Birkir Bjarnason – Pescara, Brescia – 2013–15, 2020–21
Brynjar Ingi Bjarnason – Lecce – 2021–22
Mikael Egill Ellertsson – SPAL, Venezia – 2021–
Hólmbert Aron Friðjónsson – Brescia – 2020–21
Sveinn Aron Guðjohnsen – Spezia – 2018–20
Albert Guðmundsson – Genoa – 2022–
Emil Hallfreðsson – Verona – 2011–13
Þórir Jóhann Helgason – Lecce – 2021–22
Hjörtur Hermannsson – Pisa – 2021–
Óttar Magnús Karlsson – Venezia – 2020–21
Hörður Magnússon – Spezia, Cesena – 2013–14, 2015–16

Ireland
Aaron Connolly – Venezia – 2022–23
Liam Kerrigan – Como – 2022–
Paddy Sloan – Udinese, Brescia – 1949–51

Iran
Rahman Rezaei – Messina – 2003–04
Jami Rafati – Livorno – 2015–16

Israel
Tal Banin – Brescia – 1998–2000
Shay Ben David – Trapani – 2019–20
 Yonatan Cohen – Pisa – 2021–23

Ivory Coast
Ghislain Akassou – Pistoiese, Siena – 2000–03
Jean-Daniel Akpa Akpro – Salernitana – 2017–20
Didier Angan – Verona – 2003–05
Alain Behi – Catania – 2003–04
Drissa Camara – Parma – 2021–
Souleymane Coulibaly – Grosseto – 2012–13
Christian Demel – Cremonese – 2005–06
Adama Diakité – Padova – 2011–12, 2013–14
Serge Dié – Reggina – 1997–99
Almamy Doumbia – Bari – 2008–09
Souleyman Doumbia – Bari, Vicenza – 2016–17
Jean-Armel Drolé – Perugia – 2015–17
Adama Fofana – Brescia – 2007–08
Cedric Gondo – Ternana, Salernitana, Cremonese, Ascoli – 2015–16, 2019–
Franck Kessié – Cesena – 2015–16
Jean Romaric Kevin Koffi – Modena – 2007–10
Yao Eloge Koffi – Crotone, Reggiana – 2015–16, 2020–21
Axel Cedric Konan – Lecce – 2002–03, 2007–08
Dramane Konaté – Pro Vercelli – 2016–18
Ben Lhassine Kone – Cosenza, Crotone, Frosinone – 2019–
Moussa Koné – Pescara, Varese, Avellino, Cesena, Frosinone – 2011–13, 2014–18
Vincent Kouadio – Messina – 2007–08
Cristian Kouamé – Cittadella – 2016–18
Christian Kouan – Perugia – 2017–20, 2021–
Emmanuel Latte Lath – SPAL – 2021–22
Christian Manfredini – Cosenza, Genoa, Chievo, Fiorentina – 1998–2002, 2003–04
Siriki Sanogo – Benevento – 2018–20
Alassane Sidibe – Cosenza, Ascoli – 2022–
Junior Tallo – Bari – 2012–13
Abdoullaye Traoré – Perugia, Verona – 2016–17, 2018–19
Hamed Junior Traorè – Empoli – 2017–18
Pierre Zebli – Perugia, Ascoli – 2014–17, 2018–19
Marco Zoro – Salernitana, Messina – 1999–2004

Japan
Cy Goddard – Benevento – 2018–19

Kenya
McDonald Mariga – Parma, Latina – 2008–09, 2015–17

Kosovo
Samir Ujkani – Novara, Palermo, Latina, Pisa, Cremonese – 2010–11, 2013–14, 2015–18
Idriz Voca – Cosenza – 2021–

Latvia
Dario Sits – Parma – 2021–

Liberia
Mark Pabai – SPAL – 2021–22
Zizi Roberts – Monza, Ravenna – 1997–99
Brem Soumaoro – Livorno – 2018–19

Libya
Ahmad Benali – Brescia, Pescara, Crotone, Pisa, Bari – 2012–16, 2017–20, 2021–
Jehad Muntasser – Triestina, Perugia, Treviso – 2002–05, 2006–07

Liechtenstein
Marcel Büchel – Gubbio, Lanciano, Bologna, Juve Stabia, Ascoli – 2011–12, 2013–15, 2019–
Mario Frick – Ternana – 2002–06
Yanik Frick – Perugia – 2017–18

Lithuania
Marius Adamonis – Salernitana – 2017–18, 2020–21
Tomas Danilevicius – Livorno, Avellino, Bologna, Grosseto, Juve Stabia – 2002–04, 2005–09, 2010–13
Edgaras Dubickas – Lecce – 2018–19, 2020–21
Titas Krapikas – Spezia, Ternana – 2019–20, 2021–
Linas Mėgelaitis – Latina – 2016–17
Vykintas Slivka – Ascoli – 2016–17
Tomas Švedkauskas – Pescara, Ascoli – 2013–14, 2015–16
Marius Stankevičius – Cosenza, Brescia – 2002–03, 2005–08

Mali
Mahamet Diagouraga – Modena – 2008–12
Souleymane Diamoutene – Lecce, Pescara – 2006–08, 2010–11, 2015–16
Drissa Diarra – Lecce – 2006–08, 2009–10
Ousmane Dramé – Padova, Ascoli – 2010–13
Cheick Keita – Entella – 2015–17
Amadou Konte – Spezia – 2007–08
Aly Mallé – Ascoli – 2020–21
Mamadou Samassa – Pescara – 2013–14
Mohamed Sissoko – Ternana – 2016–17

Malta 
Enrico Pepe – Salernitana – 2008–10
Alexander Satariano – Frosinone – 2021–22

Martinique 
Grégoire Defrel – Cesena – 2012–14
Emmanuel Rivière – Cosenza – 2019–20

Mauritania
Souleymane Doukara – Juve Stabia – 2013–14

Mexico
Damián Ariel Álvarez – Reggina – 2001–02

Moldova
Vladislav Blănuță – Pescara – 2020–21
Artur Ioniță – Benevento, Pisa, Modena – 2021–

Montenegro
Marko Bakić – Spezia – 2014–15
Ivan Fatić – Vicenza, Salernitana, Empoli, Verona – 2008–09, 2011–13
Sergej Grubač – Chievo – 2019–21
Marko Janković – Crotone, SPAL – 2019–21
Vukašin Poleksić – Lecce – 2002–03
Filip Raičević – Vicenza, Bari, Pro Vercelli, Livorno – 2015–20
Mirko Vučinić – Lecce – 2002–03

Morocco
Jadid Abderrazzak – Brescia, Pescara, Bari, Salernitana, Grosseto, Entella – 2005–10, 2011–13, 2015–17
Jamal Alioui – Catania, Perugia, Crotone – 2004–07
Rachid Arma – Torino, Vicenza – 2009–11
Karim Azizou – Triestina – 2005–07
Soufiane Bidaoui – Crotone, Latina, Avellino, Spezia, Ascoli, Frosinone – 2013–
Abdellah Boudouma – Cittadella – 2001–02
Ouasim Bouy – Brescia – 2012–13
Walid Cheddira – Bari – 2022–
Abdelaziz Dnibi – Palermo – 1996–97
Yassine Ejjaki – Reggina – 2021–22
Omar El Kaddouri – Brescia – 2008–09, 2011–12
Hamza El Kaouakibi – Pordenone, Benevento – 2021–
Jawad El Yamiq – Perugia – 2018–19
Oussama Essabr – Vicenza, Crotone – 2008–09, 2011–12
Zouhair Feddal – Siena – 2013–14
Ismail H'Maidat – Brescia, Como – 2013–15, 2021–22
Nabil Jaadi – Latina, Ascoli – 2014–15, 2016–17
Yassine Jebbour – Varese – 2014–15
Hicham Kanis – Novara – 2016–17
Houssine Kharja – Ternana, Piacenza – 2001–05, 2007–08
Sofian Kiyine – Salernitana – 2017–18, 2019–21
Achraf Lazaar – Varese, Palermo, Cosenza – 2012–14, 2019–20
Youssef Maleh – Venezia – 2019–21
Adam Masina – Bologna – 2014–15
Hachim Mastour – Reggina – 2020–21
Hicham Miftah – Catania – 2003–04
Rachid Neqrouz – Bari – 2001–03
Shady Oukhadda – Modena – 2022–
Abdelilah Saber – Napoli, Torino – 2001–04
Abdelhamid Sabiri  – Ascoli – 2020–22

Netherlands
Bobby Adekanye – Crotone – 2021–22
Mario Been – Pisa – 1989–90
Reda Boultam – Cremonese, Salernitana, Cosenza – 2018–22
Sven Braken – Livorno – 2019–20
Delano Burgzorg – Spezia – 2019–20
Jay Enem – Venezia – 2022–
Leandro Fernandes – Pescara – 2020–21
Maickel Ferrier – Salernitana – 1996–97
Thom Haye – Lecce – 2018–19
Ronald Hoop – Palermo – 1995–96
Jens Janse – Ternana – 2014–16
Stefan Jansen – Salernitana – 1996–97
Wim Kieft – Pisa – 1984–85
Tom van de Looi – Brescia – 2020–
Rodney Kongolo – Cosenza – 2021–22
Eli Louhenapessy – Genoa, Salernitana – 1997–98, 2001–02
Reuven Niemeijer – Brescia – 2022–
Andries Noppert – Foggia – 2017–19
Cas Odenthal – Como – 2022–
Jayden Oosterwolde – Parma – 2021–23
Jan Peters – Genoa – 1984–85
Moreno Rutten – Crotone – 2019–20
Kevin Strootman – Genoa – 2022–
Jean-Paul van Gastel – Ternana – 2001–02
Luciano van Kallen – Genoa – 1998–99
Leonard van Utrecht – Padova – 1996–97
John van 't Schip – Genoa – 1995–96
Karel Woogt – Messina – 1950–51

New Zealand
Liam Graham – Ascoli – 2012–13
Niko Kirwan – Reggiana – 2020–21

Nigeria
Daniel Adejo – Reggina, Vicenza – 2009–14, 2015–17
Saidu Adeshina – Ternana, Arezzo – 2000–06
Akande Ajide – Venezia – 2004–05
Franklyn Akammadu – Cesena – 2016–17
Mohammed Aliyu Datti – Padova, Monza, Siena – 1997–98, 2000–01, 2002–03
Theophilus Awua – Spezia, Livorno, Cittadella, Crotone – 2017–18, 2019–22
Ibrahim Babatunde – Piacenza – 2003–04
Raphael Chukwu – Bari – 2001–03
Osarimen Ebagua – Varese, Torino, Spezia, Bari, Como, Vicenza, Pro Vercelli – 2010–17
Isah Eliakwu – Ascoli, Triestina, Spezia, Gallipoli – 2004–10
Hugo Enyinnaya – Bari, Livorno – 2001–04
Mast Hashimu Garba – Chievo, Pistoiese – 1999–2000, 2001–02
Cyril Gona – Ternana – 2004–06
Ezekiel Henty – Spezia – 2013–14
Kelechi Francis Ibekwe – Venezia – 2003–04
Lucky Isibor – Reggiana – 1998–99
Stephen Makinwa – Como, Genoa – 2003–05
Jerry Mbakogu – Padova, Juve Stabia, Carpi, Cosenza – 2010–15, 2016–19, 2020–21
Kingsley Michael – Perugia, Cremonese, Reggina – 2018–21
Abdullahi Nura – Perugia – 2017–18
Precious Monye Onyabor – Cosenza – 1996–97
Joel Obi – Chievo, Reggina – 2019–21, 2022–
Victor Nsofor Obinna – Chievo – 2007–08
Nwankwo Obiora – Gubbio, Padova – 2011–13
Christian Obodo – Torino – 2010–11
Kenneth Obodo – Grosseto – 2012–13
Raphael Odogwu – Südtirol – 2022–
Nnamdi Oduamadi – Torino, Varese, Brescia, Crotone, Latina – 2011–15
David Okereke – Spezia – 2015–19
Alvin Obinna Okoro – Pordenone – 2021–22
Orji Okwonkwo – Brescia, Reggina, Cittadella – 2017–18, 2020–22
Daniel Ola – Cesena – 2006–08
Mathew Olorunleke – Catanzaro – 2005–06
John Olufemi – Palermo, Venezia – 2002–03, 2004–05
Akeem Omolade – Treviso – 2000–01
Benjamin Onwuachi – Salernitana – 2004–05
Wilfred Osuji – Varese, Padova, Modena – 2010–16
Umar Sadiq – Perugia – 2018–19
Jero Shakpoke – Reggiana – 1998–99
Nwankwo Simy – Crotone, Parma, Benevento – 2018–20, 2021–
Adewale Dauda Wahab – Ternana – 2004–05
Emeka Jude Ugali – Monza – 2000–01
Kingsley Umunegbu – Salernitana – 2008–09
Kenneth Zeigbo – Venezia – 2002–03

North Korea
Han Kwang-song – Perugia – 2017–19

North Macedonia
Nikola Jakimovski – Varese, Como, Bari, Benevento, Trapani – 2014–17, 2019–20
Mensur Kurtisi – Varese – 2014–15
Ilija Nestorovski – Palermo – 2017–19
Boban Nikolov – Lecce – 2020–21
Goran Pandev – Parma – 2021–22
Filip Pivkovski – Novara – 2013–14
Stefan Ristovski – Crotone, Bari, Latina – 2011–15
Dejan Stojanović – Bologna, Crotone – 2014–15
Aleksandar Trajkovski – Palermo – 2017–19
Leonard Zuta – Lecce – 2020–21

Northern Ireland
Kyle Lafferty – Palermo, Reggina – 2013–14, 2020–21

Norway
Haitam Aleesami – Palermo – 2017–19
Knut Andersen – Padova – 1952–53
Runar Berg – Venezia – 2000–01
Per Bredesen – Udinese, Messina – 1955–56, 1959–61
Finn Gundersen – Verona – 1958–59
Dennis Johnsen – Venezia – 2020–21, 2022–
Julian Kristoffersen – Salernitana, Cosenza – 2020–22
Steinar Nilsen – Napoli – 1998–2000
Stefan Strandberg – Trapani – 2019–20

Panama
Luiz Cesar Fraiz – Frosinone – 2014–15
Eric Herrera – Avellino – 2013–14

Paraguay
Rodrigo Alborno – Novara, Cittadella – 2012–14
Óscar Ayala – Bari – 2001–03
Édgar Barreto – Atalanta, Palermo – 2010–11, 2013–14
José Colman – Cittadella – 2008–09
Paulo da Silva – Venezia, Cosenza – 2000–02
Julio Valentín González – Vicenza – 2004–06
Rivaldo González – Venezia, Bari – 2003–05, 2011–13
Marin José Guimaraens – Venezia – 2004–05
Tomas Guzman – Ternana, Messina, Crotone, Juventus, Spezia, Piacenza, Gubbio – 2002–12
Ronald Huth – Vicenza – 2009–10
Dante López – Crotone – 2006–07
Richard Lugo – Bari – 2013–14
Rubén Maldonado – Venezia, Cosenza, Napoli, Chievo – 2000–05, 2006–08
Victor Hugo Mareco – Brescia, Verona – 2005–10, 2011–12
David Meza – Cesena – 2012–13
José Montiel – Reggina – 2009–12
Gustavo Neffa – Cremonese – 1990–91
Luis Fernando Páez – Gallipoli – 2009–10
Nelinho – Catanzaro – 2005–06
Federico Santander – Reggina – 2022–23
Claudio Vargas – Treviso – 2006–07
Cesar Verdun – Verona – 2012–13

Peru
Álvaro Ampuero – Padova – 2013–14
Joazhiño Arroe – Siena – 2010–11
Gianluca Lapadula – Cesena, Pescara, Benevento, Cagliari – 2012–13, 2015–16, 2021–
Roberto Merino – Salernitana, Nocerina – 2008–10, 2011–12
Julio Uribe – Cagliari – 1983–85
Gustavo Vassallo – Palermo – 2001–02

Poland
Błażej Augustyn – Rimini, Vicenza, Ascoli – 2008–09, 2011–12, 2016–17
Adrian Benedyczak – Parma – 2021–
Paweł Bochniewicz – Reggina – 2013–14
Michał Chrapek – Catania – 2014–15
Adam Chrzanowski – Pordenone – 2020–22
Thiago Rangel Cionek – Padova, Modena, Palermo, Reggina – 2012–16, 2017–18, 2020–
Paweł Dawidowicz – Palermo, Verona – 2017–19
Patryk Dziczek – Salernitana – 2019–21
Kamil Glik – Torino, Benevento – 2011–12, 2021–
Mateusz Góra – Vicenza – 2015–16
Filip Jagiełło – Brescia, Genoa – 2020–
Riszard Janecki – Legnano – 1946–47
Paweł Jaroszyński – Salernitana, Pescara – 2019–21
Adam Kokoszka – Empoli – 2008–11
Marek Koźmiński – Udinese, Brescia, Ancona – 1994–95, 1998–2000, 2001–02
Kamil Król – Brescia – 2006–07
Krzysztof Kubica – Benevento – 2022–
Tomasz Kupisz – Cittadella, Brescia, Novara, Cesena, Ascoli, Livorno, Trapani, Salernitana, Pordenone, Reggina – 2014–22
Jakub Łabojko – Brescia – 2020–22
Igor Łasicki – Carpi – 2016–17
Mateusz Lewandowski – Entella – 2014–15
Marcin Listkowski – Lecce, Brescia – 2020–
Radosław Murawski – Palermo – 2017–19
Sebastian Musiolik – Pordenone – 2020–21
Piotr Parzyszek – Frosinone – 2020–21
Patryk Peda – SPAL – 2021–
Filip Piszczek – Trapani – 2019–20
Mateusz Praszelik – Cosenza – 2022–
Bartosz Salamon – Brescia, Pescara, Cagliari, SPAL – 2007–10, 2011–13, 2014–16, 2020–21
Paweł Sobczak – Genoa – 2000–01
Mariusz Stępiński – Chievo, Lecce – 2019–21
Przemysław Szymiński – Palermo, Frosinone – 2017–
Łukasz Teodorczyk – Vicenza – 2021–22
Franiel Wincenty – Legnano – 1946–47
Przemysław Wiśniewski – Venezia – 2022–23
Rafał Wolski – Bari – 2014–15
Władysław Żmuda – Cremonese – 1985–87
Szymon Żurkowski – Empoli – 2019–21

Portugal
Aladje – Pro Vercelli – 2014–15
Alex – Salernitana, Pro Vercelli – 2017–18
Vitorino Antunes – Livorno – 2010–11
Gonçalo Brandão – Siena, Cesena – 2010–11, 2012–13
Aníbal Capela – Carpi, Cosenza – 2017–20
Félix Correia – Parma – 2021–22
Pedro Correia – Crotone – 2010–13
Paulo Costa – Venezia – 2002–03
De Oliveira – Modena – 2008–09
Ricardo Esteves – Vicenza – 2005–06
Tomás Esteves – Pisa – 2022–
Vasco Faísca – Vicenza, Padova, Ascoli – 2001–04, 2009–13
Bruno Fernandes – Novara – 2012–13
Pedro Costa Ferreira – Entella – 2014–17
Gonçalves – Venezia – 2004–05
João Silva (1990) – Bari, Avellino, Salernitana – 2013–14, 2015–18
João Silva (1998) – Trapani – 2019–20
Hugo Miguel Fernandes Vieira – Sampdoria – 1999–2000
José Mamede – Reggina, Messina – 2001–02, 2003–04
Manú – Modena – 2004–05
Ricardo Matos – Ascoli – 2019–21
Pedro Mendes – Ascoli – 2022–
Dany Mota – Entella, Monza – 2015–18, 2020–22
Fábio Nunes – Latina – 2013–14
Pedro Pereira – Monza – 2021–22
Nuno Pina – Chievo – 2019–20
Filipe Oliveira – Torino – 2010–11
Alexandre Pimenta  – Venezia – 2018–19
Diogo Pinto – Ascoli – 2019–20
Mário Rui – Gubbio, Spezia, Empoli – 2011–14
Diogo Tavares – Genoa, Frosinone – 2006–07, 2008–11
José Luís Vidigal – Napoli – 2001–04

Puerto Rico
Cristian Arrieta – Lecce – 2006–07

Qatar
Fábio César Montezine – Napoli – 2001–04

Romania
Mihai Baicu – Cittadella – 2000–02
Mihai Bălașa – Crotone, Trapani – 2014–17
Romario Benzar – Perugia – 2019–20
Deian Boldor – Pescara, Lanciano, Verona, Foggia – 2014–17, 2018–19
Daniel Boloca – Frosinone – 2020–
Laurențiu Brănescu – Juve Stabia – 2013–14
Sergiu Buș – Salernitana – 2015–16
Paul Codrea – Genoa, Palermo, Torino, Siena – 2001–05, 2010–11
Adrian Cuciula – Piacenza – 2007–08
Cristian Daminuţă – Modena – 2009–10
Denis Drăguș – Genoa – 2022–
Radu Drăgușin – Genoa – 2022–
Vlad Dragomir – Perugia, Entella – 2018–21
Iosif Fabian – Bari – 1950–51
Dorin Goian – Spezia – 2012–13
Gheorghe Hagi – Brescia – 1993–94
Norberto Höfling – Pro Patria – 1953–54
Dennis Man – Parma – 2021–
Marius Marin – Pisa – 2019–
Cristian Melinte – Piacenza – 2009–10
Claudiu Micovschi – Reggina – 2020–21
Emil Micossi – Catania – 1934–37
Valentin Mihăilă – Parma – 2021–
Adrian Mihalcea – Genoa, Verona – 2001–04
Bogdan Mitrea – Ascoli – 2015–16
Alexandru Mitriță – Pescara – 2015–16
Vasile Mogos – Ascoli, Cremonese, Chievo, Crotone – 2016–22
Olimpiu Moruțan – Pisa – 2022–
Valentin Năstase – Genoa, Palermo, Bologna – 2002–04, 2005–06
Viorel Năstase – Catanzaro – 1984–85
Ionuț Nedelcearu – Crotone, Palermo – 2021–
Constantin Nica – Avellino, Latina – 2015–17
Claudiu Niculescu – Genoa – 2002–03
Mihael Onișa – Pordenone – 2021–22
Daniel Pancu – Cesena – 1999–2000
Sorin Paraschiv – Rimini – 2007–09
Bogdan Pătraşcu – Piacenza, Padova – 2001–08, 2009–10
Victor Pepoli – Palermo – 1936–37
Alexandru Pena – Bari – 2012–14
Adrian Petre – Cosenza – 2020–21
Ovidiu Petre – Modena – 2011–12
Adrian Piţ – Pisa, Triestina – 2008–10
Dennis Politic – Cremonese – 2021–22
Ștefan Popescu – Ternana, Modena, Salernitana – 2014–16, 2017–18
Daniel Prodan – Messina – 2001–02
George Pușcaș – Bari, Benevento, Novara, Palermo, Pisa, Genoa – 2015–19, 2021–
Ionuț Rada – Bari – 2014–16
Ionuț Radu – Avellino – 2017–18
Florin Răducioiu – Brescia – 1998–2000
Adrian Rus – Pisa – 2022–
Ioan Sabău – Brescia – 1993–94, 1995–96
Marius Sava – Genoa – 2001–02
Nicolae Simatoc – Brescia – 1949–50
Adrian Stoian – Pescara, Bari, Crotone, Livorno, Ascoli – 2010–12, 2014–16, 2018–21
Sergiu Suciu – Torino, Juve Stabia, Crotone, Venezia – 2011–15, 2017–20
Alin Toșca – Benevento – 2022–

Russia
Viktor Budyanskiy – Avellino, Lecce – 2005–06, 2007–08
Denis Cheryshev – Venezia – 2022–
Igor Kolyvanov – Foggia – 1995–96
Ruslan Nigmatullin – Salernitana – 2002–03
Igor Shalimov – Napoli – 1998–99
Igor Simutenkov – Reggiana – 1995–96, 1997–98
Andrei Talalayev – Treviso – 1997–98

San Marino
Elia Benedettini – Novara – 2016–18
Massimo Bonini – Cesena, Bologna – 1979–81, 1991–93
Roberto Cevoli – Reggiana, Torino, Cesena, Modena, Crotone – 1995–2000, 2001–02, 2004–05
Marco Macina – Arezzo, Parma – 1982–85
Dante Maiani – Arezzo, Como, Avellino – 1966–67, 1972–74
Andy Selva – Sassuolo – 2008–09

Scotland
Liam Henderson – Bari, Verona, Empoli, Lecce – 2017–21
Joe Jordan – Milan – 1982–83
Harvey St Clair – Venezia – 2018–19, 2020–21, 2022–

Senegal
Khouma Babacar – Padova, Modena – 2012–14
Joel Baraye – Brescia, Entella, Salernitana – 2013–14, 2015–18, 2020–21
Yves Baraye – Juve Stabia, Parma, Padova – 2013–14, 2017–19
Moustapha Beye – Novara – 2013–14, 2016–18
Issa Cissokho – Bari – 2015–16
Ferdinand Coly – Perugia – 2004–05
Keba Coly – Ascoli – 2018–19
Mohamed Coly – Cittadella, Pro Vercelli – 2012–16
Racine Coly – Brescia – 2013–18
Mamadou Coulibaly – Pescara, Carpi, Entella, Trapani, Salernitana, Ternana – 2017–21, 2022–
Pape Dia – Avellino – 2013–14
Layousse Diallo – Avellino – 2016–17
Djibril Diawara – Torino, Cosenza – 2000–02
Matar Dieye – Vicenza – 2015–16
Abou Diop – Juve Stabia, Crotone, Ternana – 2013–15
N'Diaye Djiby – Juve Stabia – 2013–14
Diaw Doudou – Ancona, Bari, Torino, Cesena, Avellino – 2000–09
Ricardo Faty – Reggina – 2020–22
Alfred Gomis – Crotone, Avellino, Cesena, Salernitana, Como – 2013–17, 2022–
Lys Gomis – Torino, Ascoli, Trapani – 2011–13, 2014–15
Diomansy Kamara – Modena – 2001–02
Franck Kanouté – Pescara, Ascoli, Cosenza – 2017–20
Mamadou Kanouté – Pro Vercelli – 2017–18
Youssou Lo – Vicenza – 2012–13
Ibrahima Mbaye – Bologna – 2014–15
Maodo Malick Mbaye – Carpi, Latina, Cremonese – 2014–19
Alain Mendy – Mantova – 2008–09
Roger Mendy – Pescara – 1993–94
Moussa Ndiaye – Cesena – 2017–18
Mohamed Sarr – Ancona, Atalanta – 2002–04
Fallou Sarr – Ascoli, Cremonese – 2020–22
Assan Seck – Pisa – 2021–22
Baba Ndaw Seck – Brescia – 2013–14
Demba Seck – SPAL – 2020–22
Moustapha Seck – Carpi, Empoli, Novara, Livorno – 2016–18, 2019–20
Ousmane Senè Pape – Salernitana – 2000–01
Youssouph Cheikh Sylla – Pordenone – 2021–22
Papa Waigo – Verona, Cesena, Grosseto, Ascoli – 2002–07, 2010–12
Demba Thiam – SPAL – 2020–
Mame Baba Thiam – Virtus Lanciano – 2013–15
Pape Samba Thiam – Benevento – 2022–23
Mamadou Tounkara – Crotone, Salernitana, Cittadella – 2015–16, 2021–23

Serbia
Vlada Avramov – Vicenza, Pescara, Treviso – 2001–07
Miloš Bočić – Pescara, Frosinone – 2019–21, 2022–
Dražen Bolić – Salernitana, Ancona, Vicenza – 1999–2003, 2004–05
Uroš Ćosić – Pescara, Frosinone – 2013–15
Mladen Devetak – Palermo – 2022–
Miloš Dobrijević – Salernitana – 2002–03
Filip Đorđević – Chievo – 2019–21
Ljubiša Dunđerski – Atalanta, Como, Treviso – 1998–99, 2001–02, 2003–04
Predrag Gajić – Fidelis Andria – 1997–98
Vladimir Golemić – Crotone – 2018–20, 2021–22
Petar Golubović – Novara, Pisa – 2013–14, 2016–18
Nikola Gulan – Empoli, Modena – 2009–10, 2012–13
Filip Janković – Catania – 2014–15
Zoran Jovičić – Sampdoria – 1999–2002
Aleksandar Kocić – Perugia – 1997–98
Nenad Krstičić – Sampdoria, Bologna – 2011–12, 2014–15
Ivan Lakićević – Venezia, Reggina – 2019–
Nikola Lazetić – Genoa, Torino – 2004–06
Bratislav Mijalković – Perugia – 1997–98
Milan Milanović – Vicenza, Palermo, Ascoli, Pisa – 2012–14, 2015–17
David Milinković – Ternana, Salernitana, Lanciano – 2014–16
Vanja Milinković-Savić – Ascoli – 2018–19
Nikola Ninković – Empoli, Ascoli – 2017–20
Marko Perović – Cremonese, Ancona, Napoli – 1996–97, 2002–04
Lazar Petković – Carpi – 2016–17 
Petar Puača – Cremonese – 1998–99
Uroš Radaković – Novara – 2013–14
Ivan Radovanović – Pisa, Atalanta – 2008–09, 2010–11
Boris Radunović – Avellino, Salernitana, Cremonese, Cagliari – 2016–19, 2022–
Slobodan Rajković – Palermo, Perugia – 2017–20
Nenad Sakić – Sampdoria – 1999–2003
Vlado Šmit – Atalanta, Pescara, Bologna, Treviso, Gallipoli – 2003–10
Alen Stevanović – Torino, Palermo, Bari – 2010–12, 2013–15
Aleksa Terzić – Empoli – 2020–21
Nenad Tomović – SPAL – 2020–21
Aleksandar Trifunović – Ascoli – 1984–86
Miloš Vulić – Crotone, Perugia – 2021–
Petar Zivkov – Vicenza – 2016–17
Bratislav Živković – Sampdoria – 1999–2003

Sierra Leone
Kewullay Conteh – Chievo, Venezia, Palermo, Albinoleffe, Grosseto, Piacenza – 1997–2001, 2002–04, 2007–11
Mohamed Kallon – Genoa – 1997–98
Augustus Kargbo – Crotone, Reggiana – 2018–19, 2020–22
Jonathan Morsay – Chievo – 2019–21
Rodney Strasser – Reggina, Livorno – 2013–15

Slovakia
Jozsef Anthos – Carrarese – 1947–48
Pavol Bajza – Crotone – 2014–15
Marek Čech – Como – 2015–16
Pavol Farkaš – Ternana – 2013–14
Miloš Glonek – Ancona – 1993–94
Adam Griger – Cagliari – 2022–
Norbert Gyömbér – Catania, Bari, Perugia, Salernitana – 2014–15, 2017–21
Dávid Ivan – Bari – 2016–17
Marek Hamšík – Brescia – 2005–07
Kamil Kopúnek – Bari – 2011–12
Július Korostelev – Parma – 1954–56
Tomáš Košický – Novara – 2012–14
Richard Lásik – Brescia, Avellino – 2012–14, 2016–18
Josef Margarita – Cesena – 1946–47
Róbert Mazáň – Venezia – 2018–19
Samuel Mraz – Crotone – 2018–19
Adam Obert – Cagliari – 2022–
Martin Petráš – Lecce, Treviso, Triestina, Cesena, Grosseto – 2006–12
Nikolas Špalek – Brescia – 2017–19, 2020–22
Dávid Strelec – Reggina – 2022–
Ľubomír Tupta – Verona, Ascoli – 2018–19, 2020–21
Martin Valjent – Ternana – 2013–18
Tomáš Vestenický – Modena – 2015–16
Blažej Vašcák – Treviso, Lecce, Cesena – 2006–08

Slovenia
Siniša Anđelković – Ascoli, Modena, Palermo, Venezia, Padova – 2011–14, 2017–19
Armin Bačinović – Verona, Palermo, Virtus Lanciano, Ternana – 2012–17
Gregor Bajde – Novara – 2016–17
Jure Balkovec – Bari, Verona, Empoli – 2017–20
Maks Barišič – Catania – 2014–15
Damir Bartulovič – Vicenza – 2014–15
Vid Belec – Crotone, Carpi, Salernitana – 2010–12, 2016–17, 2020–21
Žan Benedičič – Como, Ascoli – 2015–16
Sebastian Berko – Triestina – 2002–03
Matija Boben – Livorno, Ternana – 2018–20, 2021–22
Žan Celar – Cittadella, Cremonese – 2019–21
Boštjan Cesar – Chievo – 2019–20
Sebastjan Cimirotič – Lecce – 2002–03
Domen Črnigoj – Venezia – 2020–21, 2022–23
Zlatko Dedič – Empoli, Cremonese, Frosinone, Piacenza – 2004–05, 2006–09
Robert Englaro – Foggia, Atalanta – 1996–97, 1998–1999
Matjaž Florjančič – Cremonese, Torino, Fidelis Andria, Alzano Virescit, Crotone – 1992–93, 1996–97, 1998–2001
Jasmin Handanovič – Mantova, Empoli – 2007–11
Samir Handanovič – Rimini – 2006–07
Enej Jelenič – Padova, Livorno, Carpi – 2011–19
Jan Koprivec – Gallipoli, Perugia – 2009–10, 2014–15
Luka Krajnc – Cesena, Cagliari, Frosinone – 2013–14, 2015–18, 2019–20
Kristian Kraus – Gubbio – 2011–12 
Jasmin Kurtić – Varese – 2011–12
Dejan Lazarević – Torino, Padova, Modena – 2010–13
Anej Lovrečič – Lecce – 2007–08
Žan Majer – Lecce, Reggina – 2018–19, 2020–
Danijel Marčeta – Virtus Lanciano – 2012–13
Jan Mlakar – Venezia – 2017–18
Daniel Pavlev – Chievo – 2020–21
Nik Prelec – Cagliari – 2022–
Amir Ružnić – Pescara – 1997–99
Rok Štraus – Ternana – 2005–06
Aljaž Struna – Varese, Palermo, Carpi, Perugia – 2012–15, 2016–19, 2022–
Leo Štulac – Venezia, Empoli, Palermo – 2017–18, 2019–21, 2022–
Aljaž Tavčar – Ascoli – 2022–
Martin Turk – Parma – 2021–22
Dejan Vokić – Benevento, Pescara, Pordenone – 2018–
Miha Zajc – Empoli – 2017–18
Žan Žužek – Bari – 2022–

Somalia
Ayub Daud – Crotone – 2009–10
Abel Gigli – Crotone – 2014–15

South Africa
Quinton Fortune – Brescia – 2008–09
Phil Masinga – Salernitana – 1996–97
Siyabonga Nomvethe – Salernitana, Empoli – 2003–05
Joel Untersee – Brescia, Empoli – 2016–18

South Korea 
Lee Seung-woo – Verona – 2018–19

Spain
Raúl Asencio – Avellino, Benevento, Pisa, Cosenza, Pescara, SPAL, Lecce, Cittadella – 2017–
Jonathan Aspas – Piacenza – 2007–09
Adrián Bernabé – Parma – 2021–
Álex Blanco – Como – 2021–
José Ángel Crespo – Padova, Verona – 2010–11, 2012–13
Miguel de las Cuevas – Spezia – 2014–16
Javier de Pedro – Perugia – 2004–05
Jon Errasti – Spezia – 2015–17
Cesc Fàbregas – Como – 2022–
Paolo Fernandes – Perugia – 2019–20
Salva Ferrer – Spezia – 2019–20
Pol García – Vicenza, Como, Crotone, Latina, Cremonese – 2014–18
Alexandre Geijo – Brescia, Venezia – 2015–16, 2017–19
Luis Helguera – Fiorentina, Vicenza – 2003–04, 2005–08
Rafa Jordà – Siena – 2013–14
Juande – Spezia – 2014–16, 2017–18
Keko – Grosseto – 2011–12
Antonio Luna – Spezia – 2014–15
Esteban López – Napoli – 2001–02
Pedro López – Arezzo, Genoa – 2005–07
Josep Martínez – Genoa – 2022–
Miguel Ángel Maza – Reggina – 2013–14
Raúl Moro – Ternana – 2022–
Andrea Orlandi – Novara – 2016–18
José Ortiz – Ravenna – 1999–2000
Héctor Otín – Entella – 2015–16
Rafael Páez – Bologna – 2014–15
Sergio Postigo – Spezia – 2015–16
Rubén Ramos – Brescia – 2011–12
Alejandro Rodríguez – Cesena, Salernitana, Empoli, Brescia, Chievo, Entella – 2012–14, 2016–21
Pablo Rodríguez – Lecce, Brescia – 2020–

Suriname
Djavan Anderson – Bari, Salernitana, Cosenza – 2017–19, 2021–22
Ridgeciano Haps – Venezia, Genoa – 2022–

Sweden
Viktor Agardius – Livorno – 2019–20
Kurt Andersson – Udinese – 1962–64
Sune Andersson – Roma – 1951–52
Samuel Armenteros – Benevento, Crotone – 2018–20
Martin Åslund – Salernitana – 2004–05
Jonas Axeldal – Foggia – 1996–98
John Björkengren – Lecce, Brescia – 2020–
Karl Corneliusson – Salernitana – 2003–04
Ivar Eidefjäll – Legnano, Novara – 1950–51, 1952–53, 1956–57
Emmanuel Ekong – Perugia – 2022–
Erik Friberg – Bologna – 2014–15
Riccardo Gagliolo – Carpi, Parma, Reggina – 2013–15, 2016–18, 2021–
Samuel Gustafson – Perugia, Verona, Cremonese – 2017–21
Melker Hallberg – Ascoli – 2016–17
Linus Hallenius – Padova – 2011–12
Klas Ingesson – Bari – 1996–97
Svante Ingelsson – Pescara – 2019–20
Mikael Ishak – Crotone – 2013–14
Stefan Ishizaki – Genoa – 2003–04
Alexander Jallow – Brescia – 2022–
Torbjörn Jonsson – Mantova – 1965–66
Nermin Karić – Benevento – 2022–
Valentino Lai – Palermo, Salernitana, Triestina – 2002–05
Anders Limpar – Cremonese – 1990–91
Oscar Linnér – Brescia – 2021–22
Bengt Lindskog – Lecco – 1962–64
David Löfquist – Gubbio – 2011–12
Bror Mellberg – Genoa – 1951–52
Marko Mitrović – Brescia – 2012–14
Stellan Nilsson – Genoa – 1951–52
Knut Nordahl – Roma – 1951–52
Niklas Nyhlén – Cosenza – 1996–97
Yksel Osmanovski – Torino – 2003–04
Karl–Erik Palmér – Legnano – 1952–53, 1954–57
Robert Prytz – Verona – 1990–91, 1992–93
Johan Ragnell – Reggiana – 1997–98
Marcus Rohdén – Crotone, Frosinone – 2018–
Bengt–Arne Selmosson – Udinese – 1962–64
Robin Simović – Livorno – 2019–20
Glenn Strömberg – Atalanta – 1987–88
Stig Sundqvist – Roma – 1951–53
Nikola Vasić – Reggina – 2020–21

Switzerland
Noam Baumann – Ascoli – 2022–23
Valon Behrami – Genoa, Verona, Brescia – 2003–05, 2021–22
Gaetano Berardi – Brescia, Sampdoria – 2006–10, 2011–12
Marin Cavar – Chievo – 2019–20
Alessandro Ciarrocchi – Piacenza – 2007–08
David Da Costa – Novara – 2015–17
Fabio Daprelà – Brescia, Palermo, Bari – 2011–14, 2016–17
Saulo Decarli – Livorno, Avellino – 2012–14
Francesco Di Jorio – Salernitana – 1999–2001
Antonio Esposito – Cagliari – 2000–02
Matteo Fedele – Carpi, Bari, Foggia, Cesena – 2016–18
Philippe Fuchs – Padova – 1952–53
Simone Grippo – Piacenza, Frosinone – 2008–09, 2010–11
Nicolas Haas – Palermo, Frosinone, Empoli – 2018–21
Silvan Hefti – Genoa – 2022–
Xavier Hochstrasser – Padova – 2010–11
Dennis Iapichino – Livorno – 2018–19
Zoran Josipovic – Novara – 2013–14
Philippe Koch – Novara – 2016–17
Massimo Lombardo – Perugia – 1997–98
Christopher Lungoyi – Ascoli – 2022–
Cephas Malele – Palermo, Virtus Entella – 2013–15
Alessandro Martinelli – Modena, Brescia – 2014–19
Giuseppe Mazzarelli – Bari – 2001–03
Michel Morganella – Novara, Palermo, Padova, Livorno – 2010–11, 2013–14, 2017–20
Alain Nef – Piacenza, Triestina – 2006–08, 2009–10
Marco Padalino – Catania, Piacenza, Sampdoria, Vicenza – 2004–08, 2011–13
Giuseppe Perrone – Foggia, Pistoiese, Cosenza – 1997–98, 2001–03
Lionel Pizzinat – Bari, Verona – 2001–05
Roberto Rodríguez Araya – Novara – 2015–16
Karim Rossi – Spezia – 2015–16
Jonathan Rossini – Cittadella, Sassuolo, Bari – 2008–11, 2014–15
Haris Seferovic – Novara – 2012–13
David Sesa – Lecce, Napoli – 1998–99, 2001–04
Rijat Shala – Salernitana, Novara – 2004–05, 2010–11
Simon Sohm – Parma – 2021–
Danijel Subotić – Grosseto – 2010–11
Kubilay Türkyılmaz – Bologna – 1991–93
Fabrizio Zambrella – Brescia – 2005–09

Syria
George Mourad – Brescia – 2005–06

Togo
Malik Djibril – Vicenza – 2021–22
Mohamed Kader – Vicenza – 2001–02
Steven Nador – SPAL – 2021–22

Tunisia
Khaled Badra – Genoa – 2001–02
Selim Ben Djemia – Padova, Frosinone – 2009–11
Raouf Bouzaiene – Genoa – 2001–03
Oualid El Hasni – Vicenza – 2014–15
Chokri El Ouaer – Genoa – 2001–02
Hassen Gabsi – Genoa – 2001–03
Ahmed Guilouzi – Modena – 2008–09
Karim Laribi – Sassuolo, Latina, Bologna, Cesena, Verona, Empoli, Reggiana, Reggina, Cittadella – 2011–15, 2016–22
Imed Mhedhebi – Genoa – 2001–03
Hamza Rafia – Cremonese – 2021–22

Turkey
Bülent Eken – Salernitana – 1950–51
Emre Güral – Crotone – 2021–22
Güven Yalçın – Lecce, Genoa – 2020–21, 2022–

Ukraine
Vyacheslav Churko – Frosinone – 2016–17
Vasyl Pryima – Frosinone – 2016–17

United States
Gianluca Busio – Venezia – 2022–
Anthony Fontana – Ascoli – 2021–23
Armando Frigo – Spezia – 1942–43
Roy Lassiter – Genoa – 1996–97
Andrija Novakovich – Frosinone, Venezia – 2019–
Danny Szetela – Brescia – 2008–09
Tanner Tessmann – Venezia – 2022–
Jack de Vries – Venezia – 2022–23

Uruguay

Uzbekistan
Ilyos Zeytulayev – Crotone, Genoa, Vicenza, Virtus Lanciano – 2005–07, 2012–13

Venezuela
Jhon Chancellor – Brescia – 2020–22
Rolf Feltscher – Padova – 2012–13
Massimo Margiotta – Pescara, Lecce, Reggiana, Vicenza, Piacenza, Frosinone – 1994–97, 1998–99, 2001–10
Edgar Moras – Sambenedettese – 1983–84
Yordan Osorio – Parma – 2021–
Aristóteles Romero – Crotone – 2018–19
Franco Signorelli – Empoli, Ternana, Spezia, Salernitana – 2011–14, 2015–18
Ernesto Torregrossa – Crotone, Trapani, Brescia, Pisa – 2014–19, 2020–

Wales
Craig Davies – Verona – 2005–06

See also
List of foreign Serie A players
Oriundo

Notes

References 

Italy
 
 
B
Association football player non-biographical articles